The Concordat of 1928 was signed between the Colombian government and the Vatican on 5 May 1928. The concordat was registered in the League of Nations Treaty Series on 3 August 1928.

Terms of the agreement

Article 1: The Colombian government undertook to facilitate the continued operation of Catholic Missions in Colombia.

Article 2: Specified the Ecclesiastical districts in Colombia.

Article 3: Provided an appendix to the agreement to specify the boundaries of the Ecclesiastical districts.

Article 4: Provided for the establishment of stations on the borders with Venezuela, Brazil, Peru, and Ecuador.

Article 5: Provided for government financial support of missions sent to the Native American tribes in Colombia.

Articles 6-8: Specified the funds to be allocated to maintain the missions.

Article 9: Placed the Catholic school system under the supervision of the missions.

Article 10: The Colombian government undertook to provide the missions with the land needed for their operation.

Article 11: Obliged heads of missions to submit to the Papal Nuncio annual reports about their finances, and these reports must be delivered both to the Vatican and the Colombian government.

Article 12: The Colombian government undertook not to appoint in the areas where Native American tribes resided any local officials hostile to the Catholic church.

Article 13: Obliged heads of mission to use their influence on Native American converts to promote government development plans on their lands.

Article 14: Granted mission officials the same legal status as other clergies.

Article 15: Obliged heads of missions to appoint legal representatives to deal with legal matters.

Article 16: Stipulated that the agreement shall remain in force for 25 years.

See also
 Gustavo de Greiff#Problems with the Church
 Roman Catholicism in Colombia

References

External links
 Text of the Concordat

1928
Treaties of Colombia
Interwar-period treaties
Treaties concluded in 1928
Colombia–Holy See relations
Indigenous peoples in Colombia